The Brazil national baseball team (Portuguese: Seleção Brasileira de Beisebol) is the national baseball team of Brazil. The team represents Brazil in international competitions. The team is currently ranked 18th in the world.

Results and fixtures
The following is a list of professional baseball match results currently active in the latest version of the WBSC World Rankings, as well as any future matches that have been scheduled.

Legend

2022

2019

2018

Current roster

Tournament results

World Baseball Classic

Baseball World Cup 
 2003: 7th
 2005: 14th

Intercontinental Cup 
 : 5th
 : 9th

Pan American Games
 2007: 7th

Team history
The Brazil National Baseball team is controlled by the Confederação Brasileira de Beisebol e Softbol. The team represents the nation of Brazil in senior-level men's international competition and is a member of the COPABE or Pan American Baseball Confederation. Though not a major competitor in the world scene, Brazil has steadily been improving and managed to provide a scare for both the Cuba national baseball team and the United States national baseball team in the first decade of the 21st Century. Due to the popularity of the sport among the Japanese, the Brazilian team is composed in large part of Japanese-Brazilian players. Jo Matumoto, a Brazilian team pitcher, got a chance at Organized Baseball in 2007 where he flourished in the Toronto Blue Jays AA system.

Baseball World Cup
The Baseball World Cup is an international tournament. National baseball teams from around the world compete with one another to crown a champion. It is run by the International Baseball Federation (IBAF) and is one of two active tournaments, the other being the World Baseball Classic, considered by the IBAF to be a major world championship.

2003
In 2003, Brazil placed 7th in the Baseball World Cup. The field of teams consisted of 15 teams split into two groups. Group A included Cuba, Nicaragua, Chinese Taipaei, South Korea, Canada, Italy and Russia while group B consisted of Japan, team USA, Panama, Brazil, the Netherlands, Mexico, China and France.

The order the teams are listed in above shows the teams success in the first round of the tournament. The four teams from each group who finished the first round with the best records went on to play in the placing rounds, which began with the quarterfinals. Brazil played their quarterfinal against the eventual tournament Champions, the Cuba national baseball team and nearly pulled off a huge upset. Pitcher Kléber Ojima nursed a 3–2 lead into the ninth inning, but Cuba's offense proved too powerful for the underdogs to hang on. After a deep triple and a two-run game-winning home run, the Brazilian team are crushed and stunned at their 4–3 loss. In their next game the team suffered a lopsided defeat to the United States 14–3, a game in which they were forced to use 5 different pitchers. This defeat sent Brazil into the Seventh place game where they faced and beat the South Korea national baseball team by the score of 8–3, taking advantage of pitcher Cláudio Yamadao throws eight scoreless innings and Brazil officially finishing out their first ever appearance in the Baseball world cup with a win.

2005
In 2005 Brazil competed in their second Baseball World Cup, where they were managed by Mitsuyoshi Sato. Coming off a Seventh place finish in 2003, the team was hungry for more success. The first game of pool play had Brazil taking on China. A hard-fought game by both teams ended in the 15th inning when China scored twice to beat Brazil 6–5. Brazil had a 3-run lead going into the seventh inning of the contest. Next up for Brazil were the South Africa national baseball team. Behind a strong pitching performance and sturdy defensive play, the Brazilian team one-hit South Africa and improved to 1–1. The success did not last however, as the team faced a powerful team Cuba in their next game. The final score was 11–1 in Cuba's favor and Brazil was left sitting at 1–2. The woes continued to pile up for Brazil as they lost the following three games 7–0 to the Netherlands, 4–0 to South Korea and 8–5 over Panama. In the latter game of the skid Brazil actually found itself in the lead with just four innings to play. However the bats for the Panama national baseball team came alive and they rallied for the victory. Brazil finally was able to find its stroke against an unsuspecting Sweden team and took and 11–4 victory while scoring all of their runs in each of the first three innings. The victory gave Brazil a record of 2–4 in the games and a hope to finish with a win and boost their winning percentage. Alas, Brazil would taste no more victory as they dropped their final game 12–4 to Canada, a game in which they led 3–0 early on. Their 15th-place finish in 2005 was the last time the team competed in the Baseball World Cup.

Intercontinental Cup
The Intercontinental Cup is a tournament between the members of the IBAF. Originally held in 1973 in Italy, the Cup was held every other year following until 1999. Since, there has been a competition in 2002 and 2006. As is the trend in many international baseball competitions, Cuba has dominated the Intercontinental Cup, winning 10 golds and three silvers in 16 tournaments. The 2006 tournament was held in Taichung, Taiwan November 9–19.

1995
In 1995 Brazil competed in the Intercontinental Cup for the first time. The team took 5th place that year, as the dynasty that is Cuban baseball rolled to their seventh consecutive title. Japan would take second place while the Nicaragua national baseball team was left holding the bronze.

2002
2002 was Brazil's second shot at Intercontinental Cup glory. However, Cuba ended their drought of Golds with yet another first-place finish, one of their ten in Cup history. South Korea took the silver while the Dominican Republic national baseball team hoisted the bronze. Brazil was left with a seventh-place finish and hasn't competed in the tournament since.

Pan American Games
The Pan American Games are a sort of warm up for the Olympic Games in the sense that they are held every four years and occur one year prior to the Summer Olympic Games each cycle. The Pan American Games hold competitions in multiple sports and have been held since 1951.

2007
In 2007 Brazil competed in its very first Pan American Games for baseball. The team opened up pool play with an impressive 1–0 win over Nicaragua. Pitchers Claudio Yamada and Kléber Ojima combined for the four hit shutout while the lone run was scored on a home run by Tiago Magalhaes. Brazil had put themselves in the drivers seat with a huge game 1 win, but took a step back with a 14–2 spanking handed to them by the Dominican Republic national baseball team. This loss put the team's record at 1–1 and meant that the next and final game of pool play was make it or break it for Brazil. In the matchup between Brazil and a powerful United States team, Things were extremely close for the majority of the game. Brazil took an early one-run lead in the first inning but saw it quickly taken away in the second as the U.S. pulled even. The game would stay deadlocked until the fifth when the U.S. would gain a one-run advantage, and later in the seventh would tack on what proved to be a decisive five runs. Despite late efforts by Brazil, who came up with two runs in the eighth and one in the ninth, the American team shut the door for the win and finished pool play undefeated on the 7–5 victory. This loss dropped Brazil to 1–2, a record which proved not good enough to make advance to the medal rounds. The United States would end up making it all the way to the championship where they were beaten by Cuba 3–1.

2013 World Baseball Classic

2013 roster

Preliminary roster for 2013 World Baseball Classic.

Manager:  Barry Larkin
Coaches: Tiago Caldeira, Marcos Guimaraes, Go Kuroki, Ricardo Matumaru, Mitsuyoshi Sato, Satiro Watanabe.

2017 World Baseball Classic

2017 roster

2017 Qualifying results

References

External links
Official Site of the Brazilian federation
Brazilian page at IBAF

National baseball teams
Baseball
Baseball in Brazil